Hemmatabad-e Chah Zahra-ye Bala (also Romanized as Hemmatābād-e Chāh Zahrā-ye Bālā; also known as Chāhzahrā) is a village in Golestan Rural District, in the Central District of Sirjan County, Kerman Province, Iran. At the 2006 census, its population was 18, in 4 families.

References 

Populated places in Sirjan County